Jecha is a surname. Notable people with the surname include:

Asha Mshimba Jecha (born 1962), Tanzanian politician
Mwadini Abbas Jecha, Tanzanian politician
Ralph Jecha (1931–2018), American football player

Surnames of African origin